JWH-149 is a synthetic cannabimimetic that was discovered by John W. Huffman. It is the N-pentyl analog of JWH-148. It is a potent but only moderately selective ligand for the CB2 receptor, with a binding affinity of Ki = 0.73 ± 0.03 nM at this subtype, and more than six times selectivity over the CB1 subtype.

In the United States, all CB1 receptor agonists of the 3-(1-naphthoyl)indole class such as JWH-149 are Schedule I Controlled Substances.

See also 

 JWH-120
 JWH-122
 JWH-148
 JWH-193
 JWH-210
 JWH-398

References 

JWH cannabinoids
Naphthoylindoles
Designer drugs
CB1 receptor agonists
CB2 receptor agonists